A worm cast is a structure created by worms, typically on soils such as those on beaches that gives the appearance of multiple worms. They are also used to trace worm's location.

References

External links

Soil science
Worms (obsolete taxon)